Angophora subvelutina, commonly known as the broad-leaved apple, is a species of tree that is endemic to eastern Australia. It has rough bark on the trunk and branches, lance-shaped to egg-shaped or elliptical adult leaves, flower buds in groups of three or seven, white or creamy white flowers and ribbed, cup-shaped fruit.

Description
It has rough, fibrous or flaky, greyish bark on the trunk and branches.

Taxonomy and naming
Angophora subvelutina was first formally described in 1858 by Ferdinand von Mueller in his book Fragmenta phytographiae Australiae. The specific epithet subvelutina is from Latin, and it translates to "almost velvety".

Distribution and habitat
Broad-leaved apple grows in open forest in alluvial soil and gravelly clay. It is found mainly in near-coastal areas from near Bundaberg in Queensland and south to near Taree and disjunctly to near Araluen in New South Wales.

Uses
The 1889 book 'The Useful Native Plants of Australia’ records that "The Rev. Dr. Wolls states that these "apple trees" are sometimes cut down to keep cattle alive in dry seasons, as the leaves are relished by them."

References

subvelutina
Flora of New South Wales
Flora of Queensland
Trees of Australia
Plants described in 1858